Rick Bass (born March 7, 1958) is an American writer and an environmental activist. He has a Bachelor of Science in Geology with a focus in Wildlife from Utah State University. Right after he graduated, he interned for one year as a Wildlife Biologist at the Weyerhaeuser Timber Company in Arkansas. He then went onto working as an oil and gas geologist and consultant before becoming a writer and teacher. He has worked across the United States at various universities such as, University Texas at Austin, Beloit College, University of Montana, Pacific University, and most recently Iowa State University. He has done many workshops and lectures on writing and wildlife throughout his career as a writer and teacher. He has written many books throughout his years and there is a collection of all his writings, such as short stories, and other personal writings such as essays and memoirs. There are collections of his works at Texas Tech University and University of Texas Austin.

Life
Bass was born in Fort Worth, Texas. He studied petroleum geology at Utah State University. He grew up in Houston, and started writing short stories on his lunch breaks while working as a petroleum geologist in Jackson, Mississippi. In 1987, he married the artist Elizabeth Hughes Bass, with whom he had two children before their divorce in 2015. He moved to Yaak Valley, where he worked to protect his adopted home from roads and logging.  Rick serves on the board of the Yaak Valley Forest Council. He continues to give readings, write, and teach around the country and world.

His papers are held in two collections: the Sowell Family Collection in Literature, Community, and the Natural World, part of the Southwest Collection/Special Collections Library at Texas Tech University, and Texas State University–San Marcos's Wittliff Collections.

Awards
Bass won The Story Prize for books published in 2016 for his collection of new and selected stories, For a Little While. He won the 1995 James Jones Literary Society First Novel Fellowship for his novel in progress, Where the Sea Used to Be. He was a finalist for the Story Prize in 2006 for his short story collection The Lives of Rocks. He was a finalist for the 2008 National Book Critics Circle Award (autobiography) for Why I Came West (2009). He was also awarded the General Electric Younger Writers Award, a PEN/Nelson Algren Award Special Citation for fiction, and a National Endowment for the Arts fellowship.

Works

Fiction
  (Originally published 1989)
 
 
 
 
  (Originally published 1998)
  (Originally published 2002)
 
 
 
 

For a Little While: New and Selected Stories.   Little Brown.   2016.

Nonfiction
  (Originally published 1985)
  (Originally published 1987)
 
 
  (Originally published 1992)
  (Originally published 1995)
  (Originally published 1996)
  (Originally published 1998)
 
  (Originally published 2000)

Anthologies
 Pushcart Prize
 O. Henry Award.
 Best American Short Stories 1991
 Best American Short Stories 1996
 Best American Short Stories 1999
 Best American Short Stories 2001.
 The Best American Science and Nature Writing 2013

About Rick Bass, non-fiction by others
 The Literary Art and Activism of Rick Bass, edited by O. Alan Weltzein, (2001).

References

External links

Archival Materials
 Author papers at Southwest Collection/Special Collections Library, Texas Tech University
 Rick Bass papers, MSS 8192 at L. Tom Perry Special Collections, Brigham Young University

Essays
 Danger Nonfiction in Narrative Magazine
 "Rick Bass", On Point, July 2, 2009
 "Rick Bass", Charlie Rose, August 10, 1998
 "Rick Bass", "Love of a Place", Outside Bozeman magazine
 "Fiber", Mississippi Review, September 1997
 "Paradise Lost", Orion Magazine, January/February 2005

Other Pages
 Lopate Show with The Story Prize finalists: Rick Bass, Mary Gordon, and George Saunders (2/27/07)

1958 births
American nature writers
American male non-fiction writers
20th-century American novelists
20th-century American male writers
Utah State University alumni
Living people
People from Missoula County, Montana
Writers from Montana
Novelists from Texas
Novelists from Utah
People from Fort Worth, Texas
21st-century American novelists
American male novelists
American male essayists
American male short story writers
20th-century American short story writers
21st-century American short story writers
20th-century American essayists
21st-century American essayists
21st-century American male writers